The Somaliland Coast Guard is the maritime law enforcement, search and rescue and coastal defence branch of Somaliland Armed Forces, founded on 2 October 1995.

Organization

Rank structure

Equipment 
In 2011, the Somaliland Coast Guard had extremely limited equipment. Their vessels consisted of two 20-foot motor boats and they were armed with AK-47 rifles and RPG-7 rocket launchers. In the following decade, the Coast Guard received a total of seven Defender-class boats, four from Italy and three from Sweden. Additionally, the SLCG received three cars from the European Union in 2018.

Vessels

Weapons 
 AK-47 rifles
 RPG-7 rocket launchers

Gallery

See also

Somaliland Armed Forces
Somaliland Army
Somaliland Police Force

References

External links
 Official Website

Military of Somaliland
1995 establishments in Somaliland
Coast guards